R Place was a gay bar and nightclub in Seattle's Capitol Hill, in the U.S. state of Washington.

The bar lost its lease in 2021 due to complications arising from the COVID-19 pandemic.

See also
 Impact of the COVID-19 pandemic on the LGBT community

References

Capitol Hill, Seattle
Defunct LGBT nightclubs in the United States
Defunct nightclubs in Washington (state)
Impact of the COVID-19 pandemic on the LGBT community
LGBT culture in Seattle
LGBT nightclubs in Seattle